Nicola Maria Pugno (born 4 January 1972) is an Italian scientist, mechanical engineer, astrophysicist, with phds in fracture mechanics as well as biology. He is a full professor of solid and structural mechanics at the University of Trento (previously at the Polytechnic University of Turin) and of materials science at the Queen Mary University of London (part-time, and visiting professor at the University of Oxford).

He has been selected as member of several committees such as the technical and scientific committee of the Italian Space Agency and as plenary speaker in several international workshops, events and conferences, such as at Falling Walls, at the World Economic Forum  and at the European Parliament invited by the European Research Council as well as -as opening plenary speaker- at the International Conference of Theoretical and Applied Mechanics. He is editorial board member of several international journals and has been appointed as the first field chief editor of Frontiers in Materials.

He has more than 550 publications in international journals and, for his pioneering contributions in nanomechanics, bioinspiration, fracture mechanics and adhesion, he received -among other prizes (such as the first edition in 2012 of the GiovedìScienza prize for both science research and popularization)- in 2017 the A. A. Griffith Medal and Prize and in 2022 the Humboldt Prize. Since 2011, he has received several grants also from the European Union within the Excellent Science pillars for both fundamental science and high-tech transfer, that he is developing for several high-tech industries.

References

External links 
 

Solid mechanics
Italian materials scientists
Nanophysicists
1972 births
Living people